Not One Night is an EP by the hard rock band Mr. Big.

Track listing
 "Not One Night"
 "Take a Walk" (Live version)
 "Daddy, Brother, Lover, Little Boy" (Live version)

1997 EPs
Mr. Big (American band) albums
East West Records EPs